Kris Carr (born August 31, 1971) is an American author and wellness activist. She documented her battle against epithelioid hemangioendothelioma in her documentary film Crazy Sexy Cancer.

She wrote the New York Times bestsellers Crazy Sexy Diet and Crazy Sexy Kitchen, focusing on plant-based eating. She has been featured in numerous media outlets from The New York Times to Oprah.

Early life 

Carr grew up in Pawling, New York and attended the Wooster School in Danbury, Connecticut. She attended the School of Performing Arts in New Milford, Connecticut, where she studied dance and Italian. After high school, Carr attended Sarah Lawrence College and later Marymount Manhattan College where she majored in English Literature and Art History.

Early career 
Carr began her career as a dancer, actress, and photographer in New York City. As an actress, she worked both on and off Broadway, as well as in film and television. She appeared in television shows including Law & Order, as well as dozens of commercials, most notably as a  Bud girl for two Budweiser beer Super Bowl commercials. Carr originated a role in Arthur Miller's Mr. Peters' Connections, in which she played the ghost of Marilyn Monroe, and starred in the 2001 independent film "Five Years". Carr directed and choreographed stage productions regionally and abroad and served as a faculty member at Stone Street Studios and Playwrights Horizons Theater School, both at NYU.

2000s 
From 1999 to 2006, Carr had a photography business in New York City where she shot portraits and head-shots for actors. Carr closed the studio a few years after she was diagnosed to pursue film-making and writing. In 2002, Carr directed her first short film, Redemption, about the 20th anniversary of the Bottle Bill and the homeless men and women who rely on the nickel deposits for their livelihood.

Cancer 
On February 14, 2003, Carr was diagnosed with a rare Stage IV cancer called epithelioid hemangioendothelioma affecting her liver and her lungs.

Crazy Sexy book and film series

In March 2007 the documentary Crazy Sexy Cancer was released, along with a companion book: Crazy Sexy Cancer Tips. In the book, Carr points out that when she first was diagnosed there weren't any books or movies that dealt with the situations and problems facing young women with cancer. She wanted to use her experience to help others.

The documentary was a hit at the South by Southwest Film Festival in Austin, Texas and went on to air on TLC (The Learning Channel). In August of the same year, Carr founded her blog website Crazysexylife.com. VegNews awarded a 2009 Veggie Award to Carr's blog for its Website Launch of the Year. In October 2007, Carr appeared on The Oprah Winfrey Show, along with professor and inspirational speaker Randy Pausch for a show on confronting death. In 2008, Crazy Sexy Cancer Survivor was published and included a foreword by Marianne Williamson. Early in 2008, Carr launched her online community, My Crazy Sexy Life.

Early in 2011, Carr published her third book, CrazySexyDiet, which spent four weeks on the New York Times best seller list and reached #1 on Amazon.com. Her oncologist has noted that no link has been proven between sarcoma and diet. Four years after its release, in October 2011, CrazySexyCancer was featured as part of the Super Soul Sunday series on OWN.

Personal life 
Carr resides in Woodstock, New York with her husband, Brian Fassett; the couple wed in 2006.

Further reading 
Carr, Kris. Crazy Sexy Cancer Tips. Charleston: Skirt! (2007); 
Carr, Kris. Crazy Sexy Cancer Survivor. Charleston: Skirt! (2008);. 
Carr, Kris. Crazy Sexy Diet. Charleston: Skirt! (2011); 
Carr, Kris. Crazy Sexy Kitchen. Hay House (2012);.

References

External links 

 

Kris Carr - Video produced by Makers: Women Who Make America

21st-century American actresses
American documentary filmmakers
American television actresses
American women writers
People from Pawling, New York
Living people
Place of birth missing (living people)
1971 births
American women documentary filmmakers
Shorty Award winners